Max Keil Building is a historic commercial building located at Wilmington, New Castle County, Delaware. It was built about 1850, and modified in the Art Moderne / Art Deco style in 1938.  It is a three-story, single-bay commercial building with a rectangular plan built of wall bearing brick construction.  The front facade features a large curved glass display window on the first floor and an austere, peach-colored terra-cotta wall with a large rectangular window of structural glass block at the second and third floors.

It was added to the National Register of Historic Places in 1985.

References

Commercial buildings on the National Register of Historic Places in Delaware
Streamline Moderne architecture in the United States
Art Deco architecture in Delaware
Commercial buildings completed in 1938
Buildings and structures in Wilmington, Delaware
National Register of Historic Places in Wilmington, Delaware